Eldred Kasner (2 September 1941 – 1 May 2017) was a South African cricketer. He played in two first-class matches for Boland in 1980/81.

See also
 List of Boland representative cricketers

References

External links
 

1941 births
2017 deaths
South African cricketers
Boland cricketers
Cricketers from Paarl